Irizar Group is a Spanish-based manufacturer of luxury buses and coaches. Established in 1889, the company is located in Ormaiztegi in the Basque Country, Spain. With a commercial presence in over 90 countries, its turnover exceeded 600 million euros in 2017. 

It is the market-leading builder of coach vehicle bodies in Spain (with a market share of over 40%), and ranks second in Europe, its coach bodies being available in many parts of the world. Apart from its main plant in the Basque Country, which produces around 1400 bodies per year, Irizar also has factories in other countries: in Skhirat (Morocco), Botucatu (Brazil), Querétaro (México) and Centurion (South Africa). Together they have a production of over 3,500 bodies and integral vehicles per year. The Irízar group also owns Hispacold, which makes air conditioning systems for coaches, and Masats, makers of automated bus and coach doors and ramps. 

Apart from its own integral vehicles range, Irizar works especially closely with Scania, having jointly designed the i4 body.  Irizar bodies can also be found on other manufacturers' platforms, such as Iveco, MAN, Volvo, Mercedes-Benz, etc.

Group Companies 

 Irizar, S. Coop
 Irizar e-mobility
 Datik
 Masats
 Hispacold
 Jema Energy
 Alconza
 Creatio

Products
 PB (Discontinued)
 Irizar i2e
 Irizar i3
 i8
 i6
 Century (Discontinued)
 Irizar Intercentury (Discontinued)
 Irizar New Century (Discontinued)

References

External links

Irizar website

Bus manufacturers of Spain
Basque companies
Vehicle manufacturing companies established in 1889
1889 establishments in Spain
Spanish brands
Gipuzkoa